Yuanjin Temple, also known as Temple of Goddess, is a Buddhist temple located in Zhujiajiao, Qingpu District, Shanghai.

Name
The temple is known as "Temple of Goddess" for the fact that it enshrines the statue of Guanyin Boddhisatva.

History
The temple was originally built in 1341, during the Mongolian-ruling Yuan dynasty (1271–1368). It was rebuilt in the reign of Wanli Emperor (1573–1620) of the Ming dynasty (1368–1644). The temple was enlarged in the Shunzhi (1644–1661) and Kangxi periods (1662–1722) of the Qing dynasty (1644–1911). In 1658, abbot Tongzheng supervised the restoration of the entire temple complex. Yifeng Hall, Caoxi Humble Cottage, Xigong Hall, Qinghua Pavilion and other halls were added to the temple. Of them, Qinghua Pavilion was the most prestigious structure. In early Qing dynasty, the 3rd-generation abbot of the temple and a few of his successors were specialized in either painting, epigraphy or poetry, so literati and scholars often held poetry saloons and literary discussions in the temple, giving the temple a deep cultural heritage.

A modern renovation of the entire temple complex was carried out in 1991. The temple was officially reopened to the public in 1995.

On November 6, 2018, Russian Prime Minister Dmitry Medvedev visited the temple.

References

Bibliography
 
 

Buddhist temples in Shanghai
Buildings and structures in Shanghai
Tourist attractions in Shanghai
1658 establishments in China
17th-century Buddhist temples
Religious buildings and structures completed in 1658